Buryat, or Buriat (Buryat Cyrillic: ,), known in foreign sources as the Bargu-Buryat dialect of Mongolian, and in pre-1956 Soviet sources as Buryat-Mongolian, is a variety of the Mongolic languages spoken by the Buryats and Bargas that is classified either as a language or major dialect group of Mongolian.

Geographic distribution 
The majority of Buryat speakers live in Russia along the northern border of Mongolia where it is an official language in the Buryat Republic and was an official language in the former Ust-Orda Buryatia and Aga Buryatia autonomous okrugs. In the Russian census of 2002, 353,113 people out of an ethnic population of 445,175 reported speaking Buryat (72.3%). Some other 15,694 can also speak Buryat, mostly ethnic Russians. Buryats in Russia have a separate literary standard, written in a Cyrillic alphabet. It is based on the Russian alphabet with three additional letters: Ү/ү, Ө/ө and Һ/һ.

There are at least 100,000 ethnic Buryats in Mongolia and Inner Mongolia, China, as well.

Dialects
The delimitation of Buryat mostly concerns its relationship to its immediate neighbors, Mongolian proper and Khamnigan. While Khamnigan is sometimes regarded as a dialect of Buryat, this is not supported by isoglosses. The same holds for Tsongol and Sartul dialects, which rather group with Khalkha Mongolian to which they historically belong. Buryat dialects are:

 Khori group east of Lake Baikal comprising Khori, Aga, Tugnui, and North Selenga dialects. Khori is also spoken by most Buryats in Mongolia and a few speakers in Hulunbuir.
 Lower Uda (Nizhneudinsk) dialect, the dialect situated furthest to the west and which shows the strongest influence by Turkic
 Alar–Tunka group comprising Alar, Tunka–Oka, Zakamna, and Unga in the southwest of Lake Baikal in the case of Tunka also in Mongolia.
 Ekhirit–Bulagat group in the Ust’-Orda National District comprising Ekhirit–Bulagat, Bokhan, Ol’khon, Barguzin, and Baikal–Kudara
 Bargut group in Hulunbuir (which is historically known as Barga), comprising Old Bargut and New Bargut

Based on loan vocabulary, a division might be drawn between Russia Buriat, Mongolia Buriat and Inner Mongolian Buriat. However, as the influence of Russian is much stronger in the dialects traditionally spoken west of Lake Baikal, a division might rather be drawn between the Khori and Bargut group on the one hand and the other three groups on the other hand.

Phonology
Buryat has the vowel phonemes /i, ɯ, e, a, u, ʊ, o, ɔ/ (plus a few diphthongs), short /e/ being realized as [ɯ], and the consonant phonemes /b, g, d, tʰ, m, n, x, l, r/ (each with a corresponding palatalized phoneme) and /s, ʃ, z, ʒ, h, j/. These vowels are restricted in their occurrence according to vowel harmony. The basic syllable structure is (C)V(C) in careful articulation, but word-final CC clusters may occur in more rapid speech if short vowels of non-initial syllables get dropped.

Vowels 

[ɯ] only occurs as a sound of a short e. [ə] is only an allophone of unstressed vowels.

Other lengthened vowel sounds that are written only as diphthongs are heard as [ɛː œː yː].

Consonants 

[ŋ] only occurs as an allophone of /n/.

Stress
Lexical stress (word accent) falls on the last heavy nonfinal syllable when one exists. Otherwise, it falls on the word-final heavy syllable when one exists. If there are no heavy syllables, then the initial syllable is stressed. Heavy syllables without primary stress receive secondary stress:

{|
| ˌHˈHL ||  || "to act encouragingly"
|-
| LˌHˈHL ||  || "to cause to be covered with leaves"
|-
| ˌHLˌHˈHL ||  || "steamed dumplings (accusative)"
|-
| ˌHˈHLLL ||  || "to be adapted to"
|-
| ˈHˌH ||  || "bet"
|-
| LˈHˌH ||  || "by sea"
|-
| LˈHLˌH ||  || "to the husband's parents"
|-
| LˌHˈHˌH ||  || "by one's own sea"
|-
| ˌHLˈHˌH ||  || "by one's own girl"
|-
| LˈH ||  || "through the mountain"
|-
| ˈLL ||  || "mountain"
|}

Secondary stress may also occur on word-initial light syllables without primary stress, but further research is required. The stress pattern is the same as in Khalkha Mongolian.

Writing systems 

From the end of the 17th century, Classical Mongolian was used in clerical and religious practice. The language of the end of the XVII — XIX centuries is conventionally referred to as the Old Buryat literary and written language.

Before the October Revolution, Western Buryats clerical work was conducted in Russian language, and not by the Buryats themselves, but originally sent by representatives of the tsarist administration, the so-called clerks, the old-Mongolian script was used only by ancestral nobility, lamas and traders Relations with Tuva, Outer and Inner Mongolia.

In 1905, on the basis of the Old Mongolian letter Agvan Dorzhiev a script was created Vagindra, which until 1910 had at least a dozen books printed. However, vagindra was not widespread.

In USSR in 1926 began the organized scientific development of the Buryat romanized writing. In 1929, the draft Buryat alphabet was ready. It contained the following letters: A a, B b, C c, Ç ç, D d, E e, Ә ә, Ɔ ɔ, G g, I i, J j, K k, L l, M m, N n, O o, P p, R r, S s, Ş ş, T t, U u, Y y, Z z, Ƶ ƶ, H h, F f, V v. However, this project was not approved. In February 1930, a new version of the Latinized alphabet was approved. It contained letters of the standard Latin alphabet (except for h, q, x), digraphs ch, sh, zh, and also the letter ө. But in January 1931, its modified version was officially adopted, unified with other alphabets of peoples USSR.

Buryat alphabet (Latin) 1931-1939

In 1939, the Latinized alphabet was replaced by Cyrillic with the addition of three special letters (Ү ү, Ө ө, Һ һ).

Modern Buryat alphabet (Cyrillic) since 1939

Buryats changed the literary base of their written language three times in order to approach the living spoken language. Finally, in 1936, Khorinsky oriental dialect, close and accessible to most native speakers, was chosen as the basis of the literary language at the linguistic conference in Ulan-Ude.

Grammar 
Buryat is an SOV language that makes exclusive use of postpositions. Buryat is equipped with eight grammatical cases:
nominative, accusative, genitive, instrumental, ablative, comitative, dative-locative and a particular oblique form of the stem.

Numerals

Notes

Notes

References

 Poppe, Nicholas (1960): Buriat grammar. Uralic and Altaic series (No. 2). Bloomington: Indiana University.
 Skribnik, Elena (2003): Buryat. In: Juha Janhunen (ed.): The Mongolic languages. London: Routledge: 102–128.
 Svantesson, Jan-Olof, Anna Tsendina, Anastasia Karlsson, Vivan Franzén (2005): The Phonology of Mongolian. New York: Oxford University Press.
 Walker, Rachel (1997): Mongolian stress, licensing, and factorial typology. (Online on the Rutgers Optimality Archive website: roa.rutgers.edu/article/view/183.)

Further reading

 

(ru) Н. Н. Поппе, Бурят-монгольское языкознание, Л., Изд-во АН СССР, 1933
 Anthology of Buryat folklore, Pushkinskiĭ dom, 2000 (CD)

External links

 Russian-Buryat On-Line Dictionary
 Russian-Buryat On-Line Dictionary (concise)

 
Agglutinative languages
Central Mongolic languages
Definitely endangered languages
Subject–object–verb languages
Languages of Russia
Languages of Mongolia
Languages of China
Buryat people
Buryat culture
Languages written in Cyrillic script